United States gubernatorial elections were held in 1936, in 34 states, concurrent with the House, Senate elections and presidential election, on November 3, 1936 (September 14 in Maine).

This was the last time New York elected its governors to two year terms, switching to four years from the 1938 election.

Results

See also 
1936 United States elections
1936 United States presidential election
1936 United States Senate elections
1936 United States House of Representatives elections

References 

 
November 1936 events